Tercera División was the fourth tier of the Spanish football league system. Founded in 1929, it was below the Primera División (also known as La Liga), the Segunda División, and  the semi-professional Segunda División B. 

For the 2021–22 season, Tercera División was replaced by Tercera División RFEF, which became the fifth tier due to the creation of a new, semi-professional third division by the Spanish federation (RFEF) called the Primera División RFEF.

Format
Tercera División featured 360 teams divided into 18 regional groups, corresponding to the autonomous communities of Spain (due to its size, Andalusia is divided into two groups, East and West; Ceuta is allocated to West Andalusia, while Melilla is allocated to the East). Each group was administered by a regional football federation. At the end of the season the first four teams in each group qualified for promotion play-offs to decide which teams were promoted to Segunda División B. At least the three teams finishing bottom of each group were relegated to the Divisiones Regionales de Fútbol. However the number of relegated teams often varied. The eighteen group champions also qualified for the following season's Copa del Rey, of which reserve teams were ineligible. Along with teams from Segunda División B, the remaining teams from the division competed in the Copa Federación.

Until the 2018–19 season, the 18 group winners had the opportunity of direct promotion to the Segunda División B. The group winners are drawn into a two-legged series, after which the nine winners are promoted to the Segunda División B. The nine losing clubs enter the play-off round for the last nine promotion spots.

The 18 runners-up were drawn against one of the 17 fourth-placed clubs outside their group and the 18 third-placed clubs were drawn against one another in a two-legged series. The 27 winners advanced with the nine losing clubs from the champions' series to determine the 18 teams that entered the final two-legged series for the last nine promotion spots. In all the play-off series, the lower-ranked club played at home first. Whenever there was a tie in position (like the group winners in the champions' series or the third-placed teams in the first round), a draw determined the club to play at home first.

In the 2019–20 season, the promotion play-off rules were altered by an RFEF resolution after that season was suspended and later curtailed due to the coronavirus disease pandemic in Spain. Thus, the top four teams in each group at the time of suspension were deemed to qualify for the play-offs, which will be contested on a regional basis at neutral venues. The 18 group winners were drawn against the fourth-place clubs while the 18 runners-up were drawn against the third-place clubs within their groups, all in two-legged series. The 36 first-round winners played single knock-out games in each of their regions, from which 18 were promoted to the Segunda División B. The 18 losing clubs will be able to play additional play-off rounds if possible for the remaining two spots in the third-tier division, which initially expanded to 100 teams divided into five groups of 20 and subdivided into 10 subgroups of 10 teams each, only for 2020–21. However, two more clubs were promoted after the RFEF cancelled the Tercera División repechages without replaying them, thus there are now four groups of 20 and one group of 22, subdivided into eight subgroups of 10 and two subgroups of 11.

History
During the inaugural La Liga season of 1928–29 a third level of teams known as Segunda División B was also organised. This division featured 10 teams and at the end of the season Cultural y Deportiva Leonesa were crowned champions. However the 1929–30 season saw the first of many reorganisations of the Spanish football league system and the Tercera Division was born. During its first season the division featured 33 teams divided into eight groups. The eight group winners qualified for a play-off and CD Castellón eventually beat Barakaldo CF 3-2 to be declared champions. The most significant reorganisation came at the start of the 1977–78 season with the revival of Segunda División B which replaced the Tercera División as the third level. 

On 6 May 2020, the RFEF announced the creation of a new, two-group, 40-team third division called Primera División RFEF, which made the former third and fourth divisions, Segunda División B and Tercera División, respectively, drop down a level and change into Segunda División RFEF and Tercera División RFEF; the changes were made effective for the 2021–22 campaign.

Evolution of the Tercera División

Historical classification

Latest group champions and promoted teams
In bold, group champions are promoted to Segunda División B. Administrative promotions not included in this table.

Records
Most seasons
68 – Murcia Imperial
61 – Arenas Getxo
59 – Constància
Most points
2,955 – Constància (1.43 per game)
2,876 – Murcia Imperial (1.28 per game)
2,747 – Don Benito (1.48 per game)
Most games played
2,205 – Murcia Imperial (32.42 per season)
2,110 – Arenas Getxo (34.60 per season)
2,093 – Europa (36.72 per season)
Most wins
1080 – Cacereño (57.53%)
1035 – Constància (50.07%)
947 – Don Benito (51.00%)
Most draws
591 – Arenas Getxo (28.01%)
514 – Murcia Imperial (23.31%)
509 – Baskonia (26.24%)
Most losses
756 – Lemos (44.31%)
707 – Arenas Getxo (33.51%)
705 – Murcia Imperial (31.97%)
Most goals scored
3,894 – Cacereño (2.06 per game)
3,796 – Murcia Imperial (1.72 per game)
3,682 – Rayo Cantabria, formerly Racing Santander B (1.85 per game)
Most goals received
2,838 – Murcia Imperial (1.34 per game)
2,759 – Atlético Monzón (1.45 per game)
2,674 – Europa (1.31 per game)
Most group titles 
16 – Caudal
Most promotion play-offs played
21 – Peña Sport
Highest attendance
27,214 – Oviedo 1–0 Mallorca B, at Estadio Carlos Tartiere on 24 May 2009

References

External links
Official RFEF
Group for Spanish Football Statistics Compilation (in Spanish)
 

 
4
Sports leagues established in 1929
Sports leagues disestablished in 2021
1929 establishments in Spain
2021 disestablishments in Spain